Lawrence Shapiro is a professor in the Department of Philosophy at the University of Wisconsin–Madison in the United States. His research focuses in the philosophy of psychology. He also works in both the philosophy of mind, and philosophy of biology.

Background
Shapiro graduated summa cum laude from Dickinson College in 1984, earning entry into the Phi Beta Kappa Society. He received his Ph.D in philosophy from the University of Pennsylvania in 1992. Shapiro married Athena Skaleris, a lawyer and together they moved to Madison, Wisconsin. They have two daughters, Sophia and Thalia.

He has published a number of articles in top-tier philosophy journals. He is also the author of The Mind Incarnate (MIT:2004), which challenges the widespread assumption that mental states can be 'realized' in a variety of different substances. Shapiro's argument has important consequences for a range of philosophical positions about the mind, including the functionalist analysis of mental states. He has also co-edited, with Brie Gertler, Arguing About the Mind, a book of readings in the philosophy of mind. He published a book on embodied cognition called Embodied Cognition, within which he lays out an in depth explanation of embodied cognition theories and their rivals. He has recently been awarded a Kellett Midcareer Award by the Graduate School of the University of Wisconsin-Madison.

Publications 
 "Understanding the Dimensions of Realization," with Thomas Polger, The Journal of Philosophy 105: 213-222, 2008.
 “Making Sense of Mirror Neurons,” forthcoming in Synthese.
 “Lessons from Causal Exclusion,”  forthcoming in Philosophy and Phenomenological Research.
 “How to Test for Multiple Realization,” forthcoming in Philosophy of Science.
 “Multiple Realizability, Seriously,” forthcoming in J. Yoo and B. McLauphlin (eds.) tba.
 “Evolutionary Psychology,” in the Routledge Encyclopedia of Philosophy.
 “Functionalism and the Boundaries of the Mind,” Cognitive Systems Research 9: 5-14, 2008.
 “Symbolism, Embodied Cognition, and the Broader Debate,” in M. de Vega, A. Glenberg & A. Graesser (eds) Symbols and Embodiment: Debates on Meaning and Cognition (Oxford: Oxford University Press, pp. 57–74, 2008).
 “The Embodied Cognition Research Program,” in the Philosophy Compass.
 “Epiphenomenalism – The Do's and Don'ts,” with Elliott Sober, in G. Wolters and P. Machamer (eds.), Thinking about Causes: From Greek Philosophy to Modern Physics (Pittsburgh: University of Pittsburgh Press, 2007).
 “Reductionism, Embodiment, and the Generality of Psychology,” in H. Looren de Jong & M. Schouten (eds.), The Matter of the Mind (Malden, MA: Blackwell Publishing, pp. 101–120, 2006).
 “Can Psychology be a Unified Science?” in Philosophy of Science 72: 953-963, 2005.
 “Adapted Minds,” in J. McIntosh (ed.), Naturalism, Evolution, and Intentionality: Canadian Journal of Philosophy Supplementary vol. 27 (Calgary: University of Calgary Press, 2001: 85- 101).
 “Mind the Adaptation,” in D. Walsh (ed.), Naturalism, Evolution, and Mind (Cambridge: Cambridge University Press, 2001: 23-41).
 “Multiple Realizations,” The Journal of Philosophy, vol. 97, no. 12, pp. 635–654, 2000.
 “Prediction and Accommodation in Evolutionary Psychology,” with Malcolm Forster, Psychological Inquiry vol. 11, no. 1, pp. 31–33, p. 2000.
 “Presence of Mind,” in V. Hardcastle (ed.), Biology Meets Psychology: Constraints, Connections, Conjectures (Cambridge: MIT Press: 83-98, 1999).
 “Evolutionary Theory Meets Cognitive Psychology: A More Selective Perspective,” (with William Epstein) Mind and Language vol. 13, no. 2, pp. 171–194, 1998.
 “Do's and Don'ts for Darwinizing Psychology,” in C. Allen and D. Cummins (eds.), The Evolution of Mind (New York: Oxford University Press: 243-259, 1998).
 “The Nature of Nature: Rethinking Naturalistic Theories of Intentionality,” Philosophical Psychology, vol. 10, no. 3, pp. 309–322, 1997.
 “Junk Representations,” The British Journal for the Philosophy of Science, vol. 48, no. 3, pp. 345–361, 1997.
 “A Clearer Vision,” Philosophy of Science, vol. 64, no. 1, pp. 131–153, 1997.
 “Representation from Bottom and Top,” Canadian Journal of Philosophy, vol. 26, no. 4, pp. 523–542, 1996.
 “What is Psychophysics?,” in D. Hull, M. Forbes, and R. M. Burian (eds.), PSA 1994, vol. 2 (East Lansing, MI: Philosophy of Science Associa tion:  47-57).
 “Behavior, ISO Functionalism, and Psychology,” Studies in History and Philosophy of Science, vol. 25, no. 2, pp. 191–209, 1994.
 “Content, Kinds, and Individualism in Marr’s Theory of Vision,” The Philosophical Review, vol. 102, no. 4, pp. 489–513, 1993.
 “Darwin and Disjunction: Foraging Theory and Univocal Assignments of Content,” in D. Hull, M. Forbes and K. Okruhlik (eds.), PSA 1992, vol. 1 (East Lansing, MI: Philosophy of Science Association: 469-480).

See also
Functionalism (philosophy of mind)

References

External links 
Lawrence Shapiro's Academia website

University of Wisconsin–Madison faculty
Living people
Dickinson College alumni
Philosophers of mind
Year of birth missing (living people)